Munaydhir (also as  or) is a village in the sub-governorate of Bariq in  the province of Asir, Saudi Arabia.

Climate 

See also 

 List of cities and towns in Saudi Arabia
 Regions of Saudi Arabia

References

Further reading 
Umar Gharāmah al-ʻAmraw: al-Muʻjam al-jughrāfī lil-bilād al-ʻArabīyah al-Suʻūdīyah : bilād Bāriq, Jiddah  1399 A.H / 1978.
 Maḥmoud ibn Muḥammad Al Shubaylī: Al-Shariq : fi tarikh wa jughrāfīat bilād Bāriq., Riyadh "2001 / 1422 A.H" .

Populated places in 'Asir Province
Populated coastal places in Saudi Arabia
Populated places in Bareq